Green Oak is an unincorporated community in Rochester Township, Fulton County, Indiana.

History
According to one account, Green Oak was named for an oak tree at the town site. The community contained a post office from 1853 until 1901.

Geography

References

Unincorporated communities in Fulton County, Indiana
Unincorporated communities in Indiana